Pentanodes is a genus of beetles in the family Cerambycidae, containing the following species:

 Pentanodes albofasciatus Fisher, 1932
 Pentanodes dietzii Schaeffer, 1904

References

Tillomorphini